Women's Giant Slalom and Super G World Cup 1984/1985

This was the third and last year, when Giant Slalom and Super G were counted together in one World Cup.

Calendar

Final point standings

References
 fis-ski.com

World Cup
FIS Alpine Ski World Cup women's giant slalom discipline titles
FIS Alpine Ski World Cup women's Super-G discipline titles